The Cordell Baronetcy, of Long Melford in the County of Suffolk, was a title in the Baronetage of England. It was created on 22 June 1660 for Robert Cordell, subsequently Member of Parliament for Sudbury. The second Baronet represented Sudbury and Suffolk in Parliament while the third Baronet briefly represented Sudbury. The title became extinct on the latter's death in 1704.

Sir William Cordell was another member of the Cordell family.

Cordell baronets, of Long Melford (1660)
Sir Robert Cordell, 1st Baronet (–)
Sir John Cordell, 2nd Baronet (1646–1690)
Sir John Cordell, 3rd Baronet (1677–1704)

References

Extinct baronetcies in the Baronetage of England
1660 establishments in England